Gertrude Chataway (1866–1951) was the most important child-friend in the life of the author Lewis Carroll, after Alice Liddell.  It was Gertrude who inspired his great nonsense mock-epic The Hunting of the Snark (1876), and the book is dedicated to her, and opens with a poem that uses her name as a double acrostic.

Carroll first became friends with Gertrude in 1875, when she was aged nine and he was forty-three, while on holiday at the English seaside resort of Sandown.  He made a number of pen and ink sketches of Gertrude as a young girl.  He continued to correspond with her, and to spend numerous seaside holidays with her, including several when she was in her late twenties.

Family
She was the daughter of James Chataway and his wife Elizabeth (née Drinkwater), and sister of James and Thomas Chataway.

References

Further reading
 The Life and Letters of Lewis Carroll (Gutenberg e-book).

1866 births
1951 deaths
Lewis Carroll